Spooksville is an action/adventure live action television series that aired on the Hub Network from October 26, 2013 to May 17, 2014. The show is based on the book series of the same name. The show is produced by Jane Startz, who also produced Tuck Everlasting and Ella Enchanted. The show is adapted for TV by James Krieg (Scooby-Doo, Batman, Spider-Man, Green Lantern, and Spectacular!).

Synopsis
The new kid in town discovers that he holds the key to a battle between good and evil that has been taking place for centuries in a bizarre small town that plays host to a wide array of supernatural and unexplained occurrences.

Cast

Main cast
Keean Johnson as Adam Freeman, a teenager who moves to Springville along with his father. He discovers many secrets along with his friends, including one about his supposedly deceased mother, revealing that she formerly lived in Spooksville and is one of the few people who knows its strange and dark secrets. He eventually finds out that his mother is alive from Ann Templeton, through a magic spell.
Katie Douglas as Sally Wilcox, a fearless and sarcastic girl, who also is trying to discover the many secrets of Spooksville, mostly the many reasons for the bizarre events that take place there.
Nick Purcha as Watch Waverly
Morgan Taylor Campbell as Ann Templeton. (Only credited in episodes in which she appeared) A teenage girl, who lives alone in a manor called Shadowmire, along with her servant Moorpark. She is revealed to come from with a long line of witches, starting from the town witch Madeline Templeton, who, back in the era of the Salem Witch trials, was punished and cursed the entire town of Spooksville.

Recurring cast
Samuel Patrick Chu as Brandon
Steve Bacic as George Freeman
Kimberly Sustad as Madeline Templeton, the witch responsible for cursing the entire town of Springville before her supposed execution.
Peter Bryant as Moorpark
Frank C. Turner as The Mayor
Jacqueline Samuda as Mrs. Waverly 
Reece Alexander as Officer Dugan
Harrison Houde as Stanley 'Scaredy' Katzman
Glynis Davies as Principal Blackwater
Patricia Harras as Dodie Wilcox
Erica Carroll as Laurel Hall

Episodes

Awards and nominations

References

External links

2010s Canadian drama television series
2013 Canadian television series debuts
2014 Canadian television series endings
Canadian action television series
Canadian adventure television series
Canadian horror fiction television series
Canadian television shows based on children's books
Discovery Family original programming
English-language television shows
Television series about teenagers
Television shows filmed in Victoria, British Columbia